Destination Death is a 1964 West German-Yugoslavian war film directed by Wolfgang Staudte. It was entered into the 14th Berlin International Film Festival.

Cast
 Götz George as Herbert Hackländer
 Hans Nielsen as Major a. D. Friedrich Hackländer
 Rudolf Platte as Werner Drexel
 Reinhold Bernt as Willi Wirth
 Gerlach Fiedler as Otmar Wengel
 Gerhard Hartig as Kurt Siebert
 Friedrich Maurer as Studienrat Karl Samuth
 Herbert Tiede as Inspektor Ernst Sobotka
 Mira Stupica as Miroslava
 Olivera Marković as Lia
 Milena Dravić as Seja
 Ljubica Janicijević as Nada
 Nevenka Benković
 Pavle Vujisić as Nikola Kelner

References

External links

1964 films
1964 drama films
German drama films
Yugoslav drama films
West German films
Films shot in Montenegro
1960s German-language films
Serbo-Croatian-language films
German black-and-white films
Yugoslav black-and-white films
Films directed by Wolfgang Staudte
Films about war crimes
Films about vacationing
1960s German films